Futurista (未来派野郎, translates literally as "Futurist Bastard") is a 1986 album by Ryuichi Sakamoto with themed references to the Futurist Movement. "Parolibre" and "Milan 1909" include voice recordings of Futurist Filippo Tommaso Marinetti "G.T. II" contains samples from the song "Legs" by Art of Noise.

Track listing
"Broadway Boogie Woogie", lyrics by Peter Barakan
"Kodo Kogen", lyrics by Akiko Yano, Peter Barakan
"Ballet Mécanique"
"G.T. II°"
"Milan 1909" 
"Variety Show"	 
"Daikokai - Verso Lo Schermo"
"Water Is Life"
"Parolibre"
"G.T."

Personnel
Ryuichi Sakamoto – composer, performer, producer, programming, mixing, backing vocals (Ballet Mécanique)
Bernard Fowler - vocals (Broadway Boogie Woogie, Ballet Mécanique, G.T. II, G.T.)
Minako Yoshida - vocals (Broadway Boogie Woogie), backing vocals (Daikoukai, Ballet Mécanique)
Caoli Cano - vocals (Verso Lo Schermo, Parolibre)
Maceo Parker - alto saxophone (Broadway Boogie Woogie)
Haruo Kubota - electric guitar (Broadway Boogie Woogie, Ballet Mécanique, G.T. II, G.T.)
Kenji Suzuki - electric guitar (Broadway Boogie Woogie, Ballet Mécanique)
Arto Lindsay - electric guitar (Parolibre)

Shigeki Miyata - co-producer
Takeshi Fujii - co-producer
Shigeru Takise - engineering, mixing
Hiroshi Okura - executive producer
Tohru Kotetsu - mastering
Hiromitsu Yoshiya - art direction

References

1986 albums
Ryuichi Sakamoto albums
Futurism